Wilhelmus Doll (27 October 1900 – 15 May 1980) was a Dutch wrestler. He competed in the Greco-Roman middleweight event at the 1924 Summer Olympics.

References

External links
 

1900 births
1980 deaths
Olympic wrestlers of the Netherlands
Wrestlers at the 1924 Summer Olympics
Dutch male sport wrestlers
Sportspeople from Amsterdam